Samuel Thomas Hunter Clay (born June 21, 1993) is an American professional baseball pitcher in the Arizona Diamondbacks organization. He made his MLB debut with the Washington Nationals in 2021 and has also played for the New York Mets.

Amateur career
Clay attended Buford High School in Buford, Georgia. He enrolled at the Georgia Institute of Technology, where he played college baseball for the Georgia Tech Yellow Jackets. As a draft-eligible sophomore, the Minnesota Twins selected Clay in the fourth round of the 2014 MLB draft.

Professional career

Minnesota Twins
Clay pitched in the Twins' minor league system from 2014 to 2019. In 2020, he was a non-roster invitee to Minnesota's 60-man player pool, working out at the alternate training site at CHS Field in St. Paul.

The Twins never added Clay to their major league roster, and he became a minor league free agent after the 2020 season.

Washington Nationals
On November 18, 2020, the Washington Nationals announced they had signed Clay to a major league contract, adding him to a major league roster for the first time in his playing career. On April 6, 2021, Clay was promoted to the major leagues for the first time. He made his MLB debut the next day, throwing a shutout inning against the Atlanta Braves.

He was designated for assignment on July 1, 2022, by Washington.

Philadelphia Phillies
On July 5, 2022, the Philadelphia Phillies acquired Clay off waivers from the Nationals and sent him to the minor leagues. He was designated for assignment on July 8.

New York Mets
On July 10, 2022, Clay was claimed off waivers by the New York Mets. On August 20, Clay was designated for assignment. He elected free agency on November 10, 2022.

Arizona Diamondbacks
On December 12, 2022, Clay signed a minor league deal with the Arizona Diamondbacks with an invite to spring training.

Pitching style
Clay is noted as an extreme groundball pitcher who rarely allows home runs. His pitching arsenal includes a sinking fastball and an above-average curveball.

References

External links

1993 births
Living people
Baseball players from Knoxville, Tennessee
Major League Baseball pitchers
Washington Nationals players
New York Mets players
Georgia Tech Yellow Jackets baseball players
Elizabethton Twins players
Cedar Rapids Kernels players
Fort Myers Miracle players
Chattanooga Lookouts players
Pensacola Blue Wahoos players
Rochester Red Wings players
Mankato MoonDogs players